Anjunabeats Volume 8 is the eighth album in the Anjunabeats Volume compilation series mixed and compiled by British trance group Above & Beyond. It was released in the United Kingdom on 19 July 2010 by Anjunabeats. The compilation peaked at number five on the Dance Albums Chart in the UK.

Track listing

Charts

Release history

References

2010 compilation albums
Above & Beyond (band) albums
Anjunabeats compilation albums
Sequel albums
Electronic compilation albums